Brightside was the first of three full-length albums released by New York hardcore band Killing Time. It was released in November 1989 on In Effect Records, a division of Relativity Records, and subsequently re-released in 1995 by Lost & Found Records in Europe, and Victory Records in the U.S. – both with bonus tracks. Both re-issue versions have three tracks from the Happy Hour EP released in 1992. The Victory Records re-issue also has material from the first Raw Deal demo made in 1988, of which five tracks were re-recorded for this album.

The band had previously gone by the name of Raw Deal, until a threatened lawsuit by another band of the same name caused them to change their name as they were entering the studio to record this release. Their guitarist, Mike Sentkiewitz, left the band prior to recording to pursue a different musical direction. Many of the songs he helped pen, however, are included on this album. Shortly after the album was released, the band went into their first hiatus and did not return to the studio until 1992 for the Happy Hour EP. Their next full-length album did not come until 1997, with The Method.

Overview 
Brightside not so much launched the careers of Killing Time but solidified their local reputation and radiated New York hardcore to a further audience. The band was already well known in the locality, as Raw Deal played extensively in clubs like the Ritz Theater and CBGB's in New York City. They became notable for what was known at the time as "tough-guy" hardcore – that is to say a brand of hardcore punk which was often harsher, more basic and heavier than its preceding type, and certainly more so than the west coast brand of California punk. Comparisons with thrash metal – also popular at the time – could have been drawn, but New York hardcore lacked the guitar solos of the alternate genre. The vocal style was also different – complete with gang backing vocals.

The material on Brightside was typical of the genre at the time – short and brutal songs, never exceeding three minutes and, more often than not, around the 90 second mark. Along with Gorilla Biscuits, Sick of It All and the less NYHC-sounding Murphy's Law, Killing Time made their place in hardcore history and went on to influence a new generation of hardcore in the mid-1990s.

Track listing 
"Cheap Thrills" (Anthony Comunale, Mike Sentkiewitz) – 1:06
"Brightside" (Anthony Drago, Carl Porcaro, Sentkiewitz, Rich McLoughlin) – 2:29
"Fools Die" (Drago, Porcaro) – 2:19
"Tell Tale" (Drago, Porcaro, McLoughlin) – 1:29
"What I Want" (Drago, Porcaro) – 2:11
"No More Mr. Nice Guy" (Drago, Porcaro, McLoughlin) – 2:44
"My Reason" (Sentkiewitz) – 2:13
"New Release" (Comunale, Porcaro, McLoughlin) – 1:42
"Backtrack" (Drago, Porcaro, Sentkiewitz) – 2:36
"Wall of Hate" (Drago, Porcaro) – 1:28
"Wisdom" (Drago, Porcaro, McLoughlin) – 2:54

The Lost & Found, and Victory Records 1995 reissues had the following bonus tracks, originally on the Happy Hour EP
 "Happy Hour" – 3:12
 "Going Somewhere" – 2:17
 "Whole Lotta Nuthin'" – 3:58
The Victory Records version also has the following tracks, from the original Raw Deal demo of 1988
 "Wall of Hate"
 "Tell Tale"
 "New Release"
 "Only the Strong Survive"
 "My Reason"
 "No More Mr. Nice Guy"
 "The Lines Are Drawn"

Credits 
 Anthony Comunale – vocals
 Carl Porcaro – guitar
 Rich McLoughlin – bass
 Anthony Drago – drums
 Recorded and mixed at Normandy Sound, Warren, Rhode Island
 Produced by Killing Time and Tom Soares
 Engineered and mixed by Tom Soares
 Assistant engineered by Joe Pires and Jamie Locke
 Cover art and logo by John Drago, Anthony's brother

External links and sources 
Killing Time official website
Blackout Records band page
Blackout Records Happy Hour EP page

1989 debut albums
Killing Time (American band) albums